Jerzy Adolf Wostal (6 December 1914– 1991) was a Polish association football player, one of the best forwards of interwar Poland. He was born in 1914 in Königshütte (later Chorzów).

In the late 1930s Wostal played for AKS Chorzów. The best year in his career was 1937. His team then became vice-champions of Poland (after Cracovia), and he was the top scorer of the Polish Football League, with 12 goals.

On the Polish National Team he played in 10 games, scoring 4 goals. Wostal’s debut took place on 6 September 1936, in Riga (Latvia – Poland 3–3). He was also part of Poland's squad at the 1936 Summer Olympics, but he did not play in any matches. One of the best matches in his career occurred on 10 October 1937 in Warsaw. In a 1938 FIFA World Cup qualifier Poland beat Yugoslavia 4–0 and Wostal scored one of the goals.

Unfortunately, due to injury, he was unable to take part in Poland’s legendary 1938’s World Cup match vs. Brazil (5–6). Instead of him, coach/manager Józef Kałuża fielded Fryderyk Scherfke. Wostal’s last game in the white-red jersey took place on 27 May 1939 in Łódź (Poland – Belgium 3–3).

Little is known about Wostal's whereabouts during and after World War II. He signed the German Nationality List (Volksliste) and changed the name to Georg Wostal. Some time between 1940–1944 played in the team of Vorwärts-Rasensport Gleiwitz (Gliwice), which was one of the best sides of Upper Silesia in those years, winning the Silesian championship for several times. Then, after 1945, his fate is unknown other than he died in 1991.

See also
Polish Roster in World Cup Soccer France 1938

References

1914 births
1991 deaths
Polish footballers
Poland international footballers
Sportspeople from Chorzów
People from the Province of Silesia
Sportspeople from Silesian Voivodeship
Association football forwards
Volksdeutsche